Khorkin is a Russian masculine surname, its feminine counterpart is Khorkina. Notable people with the surname include:

Dmitry Khorkin (born 1986), Ukrainian radio and television host
Svetlana Khorkina (born 1979), Russian artistic gymnast

Russian-language surnames